Ghost Story is the second album released by composer Phideaux Xavier.

After completing Fiendish, Xavier was convinced he had the resources to record his songs from the aborted album Ghost Story. He and drummer Rich Hutchins reunited to redo that album with Gabriel Moffat producing and mixing.

Tracks
"Everynight" (05:14)
"Feel the Radiation" (04:02)
"A Curse of Miracles" (06:25)
"Kiteman" (04:30)
"Wily Creilly" (05:24)
"Beyond the Shadow of Doubt" (07:45)
"Ghostforest" (05:45)
"Universally" (05:45)
"Come Out Tonight" (05:52)

Personnel
Rich Hutchins – Drums, Gongs, Electric Drums 
Mark Sherkus - Minimoog, Guitars (Solo on 3), Organ, Piano, “Grrrrrr” Synthesizer
Sam Fenster - Bass (2, 3, 4, 6, 8, 9)
Gabriel Moffat - Drum Distressments, Textures, Decay, Lead Guitar Cut & Paste, Ambient Loops, Noise Pollution
Phideaux Xavier - Vocals, Guitars (Acoustic, Volume, Lead, Fuzz), Bass
Naomi Uman - Maniacal Laugh (7)

References

Phideaux Xavier albums
2004 albums